Gussago is a town and comune in the province of Brescia, in Lombardy. The town is situated in Franciacorta, an area known for its precious wines. There are also many other cookery specialities, as spiedo (where meat such as pork, beef, chicken and rabbit is skewered with potato slices and sage leaves), meat products and wines.

The most important monument is Santissima, an old cloister situated on the summit of Barbisone Hill. The patroness Saint of Gussago is St. Mary.

Twin towns
Gussago is twinned with:

  Aliap, South Sudan, since 2005

References

Cities and towns in Lombardy